Günter Fleischhauer (8 July 1928 – 12 February 2002) was a German musicologist.

Life 
In 1952, he became a research assistant at the Institute for Music Education there. From 1955 to 1958, he held a lectureship in continuo and score playing. In 1960, he was awarded a doctorate with the dissertation Die Musikergenossenschaften im hellenistischrömischen Altertum. Contributions to the Musical Life of the Romans. In 1962, he became a lecturer in historical musicology at the Institute of Musicology. In 1979 he submitted the B Dissertation Methodologische Probleme der Musikhistoriographie, dargestellt an zwei ausgewählten Beispielen, die Musikkulturen der Etrusker und der Römer und die Telemann-Forschung. In 1980, he received a lectureship. After his rehabilitation in 1990, he became associate professor and in 1992 full professor of musicology. In 1994/94, he headed the Institute for Musicology. He conducted research on ancient music and baroque music, in particular on Georg Philipp Telemann and Georg Friedrich Handel.

In 1961 he co-initiated the Telemann-Sonntagsmusiken, in 1962, the Magdeburger Telemann-Festtage and in 1974 the scientific workshops on performance practice and interpretation of 17th/18th century music in the Michaelstein Abbey in Blankenburg (Harz Mountains). Fleischauer was a member of the editorial board of the Magdeburger Telemann-Studien, the Telemann-Konferenzberichte, the Michaelsteiner Konferenzberichte and the Michaelsteiner Forschungsbeiträge. From 1972 to 1998, he was a member of the scientific advisory board of the Institute of Performance Practice Michaelstein. From 1991, he was a board member of the international .

Fleischhauer's books and music are kept in the Centre for Telemann-Pflege und -Forschung  Magdeburg.

Awards 
 1991: Georg-Philipp-Telemann-Preis der Landeshauptstadt Magdeburg
 1998: Telemann-Pokal des Telemann-Arbeitskreises

Publications 
 Etrurien und Rom (Musikgeschichte in Bildern, volume 2). VEB Deutscher Verlag für Musik, Leipzig 1964, 1978 (2nd edition).
 Annotationen zu Georg Philipp Telemann. Ausgewählte Schriften (Magdeburger Telemann-Studien. 19). Published by Carsten Lange. Olms, Hildesheim among others 2007, .

Further reading 
 Bernd Baselt (ed.): Musikalisches Füllhorn. Aufsätze zur Musik. Günter Fleischhauer zum 60. Geburtstag. Abteilung Wissenschaftspublizistik der Martin-Luther-Universität Halle-Wittenberg, Halle (Saale) 1990, .
 Carl Dahlhaus, Hans Heinrich Eggebrecht (ed.): Brockhaus-Riemann-Musiklexikon. In vier Bänden und einem Ergänzungsband. Ergänzungsband: A–Z. 2., überarbeitete und erweiterte Auflage. Schott, Mainz 1995, .
 Günter Fleischhauer: Fleischhauer, Günter. In Friedrich Blume (editor.): Die Musik in Geschichte und Gegenwart (MGG). First edition, volume 16 (Supplement 2: Eardsen – Zweibrücken). Bärenreiter/Metzler, Kassel u. a. 1976, 
 Günter Fleischhauer: Fleischhauer, Günter. In Ludwig Finscher (ed.): Die Musik in Geschichte und Gegenwart. Second edition, Personal part, volume 6 (Eames – Franco). Bärenreiter/Metzler, Kassel among others 2001,  (Online edition, subscription required for full access)
 Dieter Gutknecht, Hartmut Krones, Frieder Zschoch (ed.): Telemanniana et alia musicologica. Festschrift für Günter Fleischhauer zum 65. Geburtstag (Michaelsteiner Forschungsbeiträge, 17). Ziethen, Oschersleben 1995, .
 Wolfgang Ruf (ed.): Musik als Klangrede. Festschrift zum 70. Geburtstag von Günter Fleischhauer. Böhlau, Cologne among others 2001, .
 Eitelfriedrich Thom (ed.): Günter Fleischhauer zum sechzigsten Geburtstag am 8. Juli 1988. Kultur- und Forschungsstätte Michaelstein, Michaelstein 1988.

References

External links 
 
 
 

German music historians
20th-century German musicologists
Academic staff of the Martin Luther University of Halle-Wittenberg
1928 births
2002 deaths
Writers from Magdeburg